The Simcock House is a historic house in Swansea, Massachusetts.  Construction of this -story vernacular Georgian house is estimated to have been around 1765; little is known of its history before the 19th century.  It is architecturally unusual, with three asymmetrically placed bays and a large central chimney.  The door is in the center bay, with a window above that is slightly narrower than the flanking windows.

The house was listed on the National Register of Historic Places in 1990.

See also
National Register of Historic Places listings in Bristol County, Massachusetts

References

Houses in Bristol County, Massachusetts
Swansea, Massachusetts
Houses on the National Register of Historic Places in Bristol County, Massachusetts